KITO-FM 96.1 FM is a radio station licensed to Vinita, Oklahoma.  The station broadcasts a Sports format and is owned by KXOJ, Inc.

References

External links
KITO-FM's official website

ITO-FM
Sports radio stations in the United States